

See also
 List of New Jersey state legislatures

State Senate Delegations

New Jersey